Lluidas Vale, also known as Worthy Park, is a settlement in Saint Catherine Parish, Jamaica. It has a population of 3,413 as of 2009.

Etymology
The name of the settlement either refers to the Spanish term luzida, meaning 'happy' or 'fine', or lluvias, meaning 'rains'.

Geography and geology
A church is located at the heart of Lluidas Vale. Lluidas Vales has an abundance of sugarcane fields and also has a wide range of limestone karst. In particular, the settlement is surrounded by kegelkarst.

Flora and fauna
Most of the vegetation in Lluidas Vale has been cleared for agricultural purposes, although the wet limestone forest remains largely intact. 

Trees commonly found in Lluidas Vale include: 

 Terminalia latifolia
 Cedrela odorata
 Nectandra trees
  fig (Ficus) trees

Lluidas Vale is also home to a variety of birds including:
 
Podiceps dominicus
 Podilymbus podiceps
 Butorides virescens
 Hydranassa tricolor
 Florida caerulea
 Ardeola ibis
 Egretta thula
 Nyctanassa violacea
 Cathartes aura
 Buteo jamaicensis
 Falco sparverius
 Porzana carolina
 Porphyrula martinica
 Gallinula chloropus
 Fulica americana
 Jacana spinosa
 Charadrius vociferus
 Columba leucocephala
 Zenaida aurita
 Zenaida asiatica
 Columbigallina passerina
 Leptotila jamaicensis
 Geotrygon montana
 Geotrygon versicolor
 Amazona collaria
 Amazona agilis
 Aratinga nana
 Forpus passerinus
 Hyetornis pluvialis
 Saurothera vetula
 Crotophaga ani
 Tyto alba
 Pseudoscops grammicus
 Nyctibius griseus
 Chordeiles minor
 Streptoprocne zonaris
 Cypseloides niger
 Tachornis phoenicobia
 Anthracothorax mango
 Trochilus polytmus
 Mellisuga minima
 Todus todus
 Centurus radiolatus
 Sphyrapicus varius
 Platypsaris niger
 Tyrannus dominicensis
 Tyrannus caudifasciatus
 Myiarchus stolidus
 Myiarchus barbirostris
 Myiarchus validus
 Contopus caribaeus
 Hirundo rustica
 Petrochelidon fulva
 Corvus jamaicensis
 Mimus polyglottos
 Dumetella carolinensis
 Turdus jamaicensis
 Turdus aurantius
 Myadestes genibarbis
 Sturnus vulgaris
 Vireo modestus
 Vireo altiloquus
 Vireo osburni
 Mniotilta varia
 Helmitheros vermivorus
 Parula americana
 Dendroica magnolia
 Dendroica caerulescens
 Dendroica tigrina
 Dendroica virens
 Dendroica striata
 Dendroica pharetra
 Seiurus aurocapillus
 Setophaga ruticilla
 Coereba flaveola
 Euneornis campestris
 Pyrrhuphonia jamaica
 Spindalis zena
 Piranga olivacea
 Quiscalus niger
 Icterus leucopteryx
 Icterus galbula
 Sicalis flaveola
 Loxigilla violacea
 Tiaris olivacea
 Tiaris bicolor
 Loxipasser anoxanthus
 Ammodramus savannarum

References

Populated places in Saint Catherine Parish